For Love of Gold is a 1908 American silent short crime film directed by D. W. Griffith. It is based on the short story "Just Meat" by Jack London.

Cast
 Harry Solter as Thief / Butler
 George Gebhardt as Thief
 Charles Gorman
 Charles Inslee

References

External links
 

1908 films
1900s crime films
American crime films
American silent short films
American black-and-white films
Films based on works by Jack London
Films directed by D. W. Griffith
1900s American films